Methodist College, founded in 1866 is a girls school in Colombo, managed by the Methodist Church in Sri Lanka. 

Leading number one girls schools in Sri Lanka.

The school currently maintains a student body of 1800 and approximately 75 teachers. The institution conducts 3 streams of classes in Sinhala, Tamil and English with English as a second language.

History
In 1866, Miss Catherine Scott, a British missionary came to Sri Lanka (then known as Ceylon) and started the "Kollupitiya Girl's English School" in a large room with barely 40 girls. In 1883, when Miss Scott left, the school was registered as a "Grant-in-Aid" English high school with 99 students and renamed as "Kollupitiya Girls High School."

1915 The School was recognized as a fully organized Secondary School and its name was changed to Methodist College. In 1917, the 1st Colombo (Methodist College) Guide Company was founded by Ms. Choate and captained by Ms. Shire. In 1919 the Old Girls Association was established and this organization now has branches in London, Melbourne, Sydney, Toronto, Victoria and Southern California. 

In 1930 the House system was introduced in the school with four houses Scott, Choate, Rigby and Restarick. During the 1950s, Framjee House (on Station Road) was bought by the School. The Junior Day Students moved in downstairs. During the mid 1950w, two new Houses were inaugurated – Park House and Shire House.

The Auditorium was declared open on June 24, 1988, by the Rev. Harold Fernando, President of the Methodist Conference.

Houses
The student body is divided into six houses 

Restarick House 
 Colour - Crimson
 Motto - Utmost for the highest
Shire House
 Colour - Mauve
 Motto - Aim high and persevere
Rigby House
 Colour - Primrose yellow
 Motto - Never say die
Scott House
 Colour - Brick
 Motto - Play the game
Park House
 Colour - Silver Grey
 Motto - Unity is strength
Choate House
 Colour - Brown 
 Motto - Knit together in love and service

Notable alumni

References

External links
 www.methodistcollege.org
 Methodist College prepares to celebrate 150th anniversary in 2016

1866 establishments in Ceylon
Educational institutions established in 1866
Girls' schools in Sri Lanka
Methodist schools in Sri Lanka
Private schools in Sri Lanka
Schools in Colombo